Albert Macklin (born 1958) is an American film and stage actor.

Filmography

Film 
 David & Layla (2005)
 Cradle Will Rock (1999)
 Daylight (1996)
 Date with an Angel (1987)

Television 
 Law & Order: Criminal Intent episode "Gemini" (2003)
 Ed episode "The Music Box" (2001)
 Frasier episode "Perspectives on Christmas" (1997)
 The Equalizer episode "Pretenders" (1986)
 Family Ties episode "Checkmate" (1986)
 Remington Steele episode "Steele in the Family" (1985)
 Dreams (1984)

Stage 
 The Torch-Bearers (2000)
 Hamlet
 Finding Donis Anne
 June Moon
 Jeffrey
 Doonesbury Broadway - 1983 - ibdb Internet Broadway data base
 Dog Opera

References

External links 
 

Living people
1958 births
American male film actors
American male stage actors